Normanby Island may refer to:

 Normanby Island (Queensland), in Australia
 Normanby Island, Papua New Guinea